Aaron Paul Springer is an American cartoonist, animator, artist, writer, director, and voice actor. He is the creator of the Disney XD original series Billy Dilley's Super-Duper Subterranean Summer, in which he voices the main character, Billy Dilley. He is best known for his work on the Nickelodeon animated series SpongeBob SquarePants, for which he contributed to as a writer, storyboard artist and storyboard director  for eight seasons, as well as co-writing and storyboarding its 2004 film adaptation.

Career
A graduate of the California Institute of the Arts, Springer began his career in animation working for Spümcø. He was best known for creating pilots at Cartoon Network Studios that were never picked up as full series, but have developed cult followings. His most recognizable pilot was Korgoth of Barbaria for Adult Swim in 2006, which was originally picked up for a full series, because of its critical and commercial success with garnering high ratings. Later events, including a formal petition to revive the show, would indicate that it was dropped before production began, due to high production costs. Springer also created Periwinkle Around the World back in 2004 for Cartoon Network, that was divided into five separate two-minute shorts, produced and directed by Genndy Tartakovsky. Refusing to pick it up as a full series, Cartoon Network instead was going to release five shorts from the pilot as mobile phone content, but ended up putting them in their Sunday Pants anthology series in 2005. Springer's last pilot for Cartoon Network was Baloobaloob's Fun Park in 2009, which was produced as part of The Cartoonstitute.

Springer gained notoriety through his efforts as a writer and storyboard artist on various movies and television series. His notable efforts include Samurai Jack (2002–2003), Dexter's Laboratory (2003), The Grim Adventures of Billy & Mandy (2005–2007) and SpongeBob SquarePants (1999–2012). More recently, he has contributed to Gravity Falls (2012–2013), Wander Over Yonder (2014) and the Mickey Mouse (2013–2015) television series.

Springer created Billy Dilley's Super-Duper Subterranean Summer for Disney XD, where he voices the main character, Billy Dilley. The show was first announced in 2014 as a potential pilot. In March 2016, it was confirmed that Disney XD has greenlit the show for a full series, and it officially premiered on June 3, 2017. As of 2019, Springer is currently at Warner Bros. Animation developing a new project.

Springer has collaborated with various animation veterans such as Lynne Naylor, Chris Reccardi, Alex Hirsch, Craig McCracken, Genndy Tartakovsky, Paul Rudish, Rumen Petkov, Dave Wasson, Rob Renzetti, Maxwell Atoms, C. H. Greenblatt, Chris Savino, Stephen Hillenburg, and John Kricfalusi. Besides Billy Dilley, he has created numerous pilots for Cartoon Network and Adult Swim that, although never made into full series, have developed cult followings. Springer's cartoons are unique for their inclusion of extended gags, anthropomorphism and off-model poses. Springer has cited Richard Scarry, Sergio Aragonés, Frank Frazetta, Vaughn Bodē, Akira Toriyama, Hideshi Hino, Shigeru Mizuki and Hugo Pratt amongst his influences.

Filmography

Television

Film

Music videos and Internet

References

External links

FunTowne: Aaron Springer's website
Interview with Aaron Springer

Living people
American animators
American animated film directors
American animated film producers
California Institute of the Arts alumni
Spümcø
Disney Television Animation people
Nickelodeon Animation Studio people
Cartoon Network Studios people
American storyboard artists
American television writers
American male screenwriters
American male television writers
American television directors
American television producers
Primetime Emmy Award winners
Year of birth missing (living people)